The Grammy Award for Best Blues Album was an award presented at the Grammy Awards, a ceremony that was established in 1958 and originally called the Gramophone Awards, to recording artists for releasing albums in the blues genre. Honors in several categories are presented at the ceremony annually by the National Academy of Recording Arts and Sciences of the United States to "honor artistic achievement, technical proficiency and overall excellence in the recording industry, without regard to album sales or chart position".

According to the 54th Grammy Awards guideline the category was "for albums containing at least 51% playing time of new vocal or instrumental blues recordings".

This award combined the previous categories for Best Contemporary Blues Album and Best Traditional Blues Album, which both existed between 1983 and 2011. The Recording Academy decided to create this new category for 2012 upon stating there were "challenges in distinguishing between... Contemporary and Traditional Blues".

In 2017 the distinction between contemporary and traditional blues albums was reinstated. Both categories returned, while the Best Blues Album category was discontinued.

Recipients

 Each year is linked to the article about the Grammy Awards held that year.

See also
List of Grammy Award categories

References

External links
Official Site of the Grammy Awards

 
Blues Album
Blues music awards
Album awards